The 2022 New Brunswick Tankard, the provincial men's curling championship for New Brunswick, was held from February 9 to 13 at the Miramichi Curling Club in Miramichi, New Brunswick. The winning James Grattan team represented New Brunswick at the 2022 Tim Hortons Brier, Canada's national men's curling championship in Lethbridge, Alberta.

Unlike previous seasons, there was no preliminary round to qualify eight teams for the provincial championship. Any team was able to register to compete in the championship.

Teams
The teams are listed as follows:

Knockout brackets

Source:

A event

B event

C event

Knockout results
All draw times listed in Atlantic Time (UTC−04:00).

Draw 1
Wednesday, February 9, 2:30 pm

Draw 2
Wednesday, February 9, 7:30 pm

Draw 3
Thursday, February 10, 9:30 am

Draw 4
Thursday, February 10, 2:30 pm

Draw 5
Thursday, February 10, 7:30 pm

Draw 6
Friday, February 11, 1:30 pm

Draw 7
Friday, February 11, 6:30 pm

Draw 8
Saturday, February 12, 1:30 pm

Draw 9
Saturday, February 12, 6:30 pm

Playoffs

Team Grattan had to be beaten twice.

Semifinal
Sunday, February 13, 9:30 am

Final
Not necessary

References

2022 Tim Hortons Brier
Curling competitions in New Brunswick
Sport in Miramichi, New Brunswick
2022 in New Brunswick
New Brunswick Tankard